Mitchell Franklin "Mitch" Jayne (July 5, 1928 – August 2, 2010) was emcee and upright bass player in The Dillards bluegrass band, the band often remembered for their several Andy Griffith Show appearances as the Darling Family, 1963–1966, as well as touring throughout southern California in the late 1960s.

Mitch Jayne, born in Hammond, Indiana, was the son of Bea and Gus Jayne. Following US Navy service and after a stint at the University of Missouri, he began teaching in one-room schools in Dent County, where he documented the use of the forgotten words and phrases of Elizabethan English spoken by his pupils.

Mitchell Jayne was an author, musician, and storyteller. Several tunes Mitch Jayne co-wrote with The Dillards are now considered bluegrass classics. Dooley; There is a Time; The Old Home Place, and The Whole World Round.  He also authored four books, Home Grown Stories & Home Fried Lies, The Forest in the Wind, Old Fish Hawk, and Fiddler's Ghost. Jayne had almost finished another novel, Glory Hole War, prior to his death, with only one chapter left unwritten. He narrated the ending to his editor during the last two weeks of his life so that the book could be released.

Turning his talents to other venues, Jayne authored a weekly column in the Shannon County Current Wave, in his adopted Ozark hometown of Eminence, Missouri. Jayne also hosted a radio show in Salem, Missouri at KSMO that attracted national attention for its satire, including the Snake and Tick Market Report, a regular feature that reported market prices for Hoo-Boy White Dot Crushproof Dry Valley Wonder Ticks and black, copperhead, coachwhip, garter and rattle snakes.

References 

1928 births
2010 deaths
University of Missouri alumni
Guitarists from Missouri
American male novelists
20th-century American novelists
People from Eminence, Missouri
20th-century American male writers
20th-century American bass guitarists
The Dillards members